The Order of Agricultural Merit was established with the intention of awarding Romanian and Foreign Civilians who made contributions to Agriculture, especially after the Great Depression that Romania was steadily recovering from.

The Order was abolished during the abolishment of the Romanian Monarchy in 1947.

The Order was reinstated during the Socialist Republic of Romania and abolished after the Romanian Revolution.

On 31 March 2000, the Order was reinstated again.

Grades 
There are four grades of this merit: Grand Officer, Commander, Officer, and Knight.

References 

Military awards and decorations of Romania
Orders, decorations, and medals of Romania